Javier Navarrete (born May 9, 1956) is a Spanish film score composer. His best known score, for which he received an Oscar nomination, was for Pan's Labyrinth (his second collaboration with Guillermo del Toro, the first being The Devil's Backbone).

Navarrete was born in Teruel. His scores include Whore, Tras el cristal, Dot the i, and other Spanish films. In addition, he scored 2009's Cracks (directed by Jordan Scott), 2012's Byzantium (directed by Neil Jordan) and the U.S. productions, Mirrors, Wrath of the Titans and Inkheart. His score for the HBO film Hemingway & Gellhorn won him an Emmy Award. He also produced in 2015 the soundtrack for the Hong Kong-based film Zhong Kui: Snow Girl and the Dark Crystal.

Works

1980s

1990s

2000s

2010s

2020s

Awards and nominations

Won
Emmy Award 2012 Outstanding Music Composition for a Miniseries, Movie, or Special (Original Dramatic Score) - Hemingway & Gellhorn
BMI Film & TV Awards 2012 Film Music - Wrath of the Titans
Ariel Award 2007 Best Film Music - Pan's Labyrinth

Nominations
Academy Award 2007 Best Original Score - Pan's Labyrinth
Fangoria Chainsaw Awards 2014 Best Score - Byzantium
Grammy Award 2008 Best Compilation Soundtrack Album for a Motion Picture, Television or Other Visual Media - Pan's Labyrinth
Goya Award 2007 Best Original Score - Pan's Labyrinth
Online Film Critics Society Awards 2007 Best Original Score - Pan's Labyrinth

References

External links

Spanish film score composers
Male film score composers
People from Teruel
1956 births
Living people
Spanish male musicians